Anisul Islam Mahmud (born 20 December 1947) is the former Minister of Environment and Forest in the Cabinet of Bangladesh. He previously served as Minister of Foreign Affairs from July 1985 to December 1990.

Mahmud was educated at the University of Dhaka (BA Economics, 1969), Quaide Azam University in Karachi (MSc Economics) and the University of Essex (MA Economics, 1972). He was called to the Bar at Lincoln's Inn in 1975. He was a Lecturer of Economics at the University of Dhaka from 1969 to 1970, a Senior Research Associate in Economics at the University of East Anglia from 1972 to 1973, and lecturer of economics at the University of Hertfordshire from 1973 to 1977.

He became the Member of Parliament for Chittagong-5 in 1979, and was re-elected in 1986 and 1988. He ran again in the June 1996 general election, but lost to the incumbent, Syed Wahidul Alam. He became the MP for Chittagong-4 in 2008, was elected unopposed to Chittagong-5 in 2014, and was re-elected in 2018.

References

1947 births
Living people
People from Hathazari Upazila
University of Dhaka alumni
Alumni of the University of Essex
Academic staff of the University of Dhaka
Academics of the University of Hertfordshire
Foreign ministers of Bangladesh
Environment, Forest and Climate Change ministers of Bangladesh
11th Jatiya Sangsad members
10th Jatiya Sangsad members
2nd Jatiya Sangsad members
3rd Jatiya Sangsad members
4th Jatiya Sangsad members
9th Jatiya Sangsad members